Mount Pleasant is a city in and the county seat of Henry County, Iowa. The population was 9,274 in the 2020 census, an increase from 8,668 in the 2010 census. It was founded in 1835 by pioneer Presley Saunders.

History 

The first permanent settlement at Mount Pleasant was made in 1833. Mount Pleasant was incorporated as a town in 1842, and again in 1851.

In 1869, Mount Pleasant was the site of a solar eclipse expedition, under the command of James Craig Watson and sponsored by National Almanac. The total solar eclipse occurred on August 7, 1869.

In the Union Block building in 1869, Arabella A. Mansfield became the first woman in the United States to be awarded a license to practice law. She had passed the bar exam with high scores and won a court case for entry to the bar. The legislature changed its statute.

The third floor of the Union Block housed the Opera House or Union Hall, a gathering place for the community. It attracted national speakers on tour, including abolitionists Frederick Douglass, Sojourner Truth, and Anna Dickinson. James Harlan also spoke there, as he was president of Iowa Wesleyan College in the town, and later was elected several times to the United States Senate. This building had been considered one of the most endangered historic sites in Iowa.

The Mount Pleasant Mental Health Institute was built in 1861. However, in 1936, a fire did great damage to the building. The hospital had to be closed, as little of the facility survived the fire.

On December 10, 1986, Ralph Orin Davis, a resident, walked into a city council meeting and shot Mayor Edward King and two council members. Mayor King died of his wounds after being shot point blank in the head. The 69-year-old gunman had attended a couple of previous meetings, complaining about a backed-up sewer and wanting the city to pay for damages to his house. The two council members were seriously wounded. Tom Vilsack became the replacement mayor, later serving as Governor of Iowa for 8 years, and then Secretary of Agriculture under the Obama and Biden administrations.

Geography 
Mount Pleasant is in central Henry County at the intersection of US Routes 218 and 
34.

Mount Pleasant's population density is estimated at 1,123 people per square mile, which is considered low for urban areas.

Demographics

2010 census
As of the census of 2010, there were 8,668 people, 3,127 households, and 1,935 families living in the city. The racial makeup of the city was 85.7% White, 4.3% African American, 0.4% Native American, 4.4% Asian, 0.3% Pacific Islander, 2.4% from other races, and 2.5% from two or more races. Hispanic or Latino of any race were 6.7% of the population.

There were 3,127 households, of which 30.5% had children under the age of 18 living with them, 46.1% were married couples living together, 10.8% had a female householder with no husband present, 4.9% had a male householder with no wife present, and 38.1% were non-families. 33.3% of all households were made up of individuals, and 15% had someone living alone who was 65 years of age or older. The average household size was 2.31 and the average family size was 2.94.

The median age in the city was 37.3 years. 21.1% of residents were under the age of 18; 12.3% were between the ages of 18 and 24; 26.5% were from 25 to 44; 24.8% were from 45 to 64; and 15.3% were 65 years of age or older. The gender makeup of the city was 52.7% male and 47.3% female.

2000 census
As of the census of 2000, there were 8,751 people, 3,119 households, and 1,940 families living in the city. The racial makeup of the city was 90.46% White, 3.19% African American, 0.32% Native American, 3.53% Asian, 0.06% Pacific Islander, 0.73% from other races, and 1.71% from two or more races. Hispanic or Latino of any race were 1.79% of the population.

There were 3,119 households, out of which 31.4% had children under the age of 18 living with them, 49.3% were married couples living together, 9.9% had a female householder with no husband present, and 37.8% were non-families. 33.2% of all households were made up of individuals, and 14.3% had someone living alone who was 65 years of age or older. The average household size was 2.34 and the average family size was 3.01.

Age spread: 22.5% under the age of 18, 11.6% from 18 to 24, 31.5% from 25 to 44, 20.2% from 45 to 64, and 14.1% who were 65 years of age or older. The median age was 36 years. For every 100 females, there were 110.0 males. For every 100 females age 18 and over, there were 113.6 males.

The median income for a household in the city was $35,558, and the median income for a family was $46,063. Males had a median income of $31,524 versus $22,628 for females. The per capita income for the city was $16,824. About 8.3% of families and 10.2% of the population were below the poverty line, including 11.5% of those under age 18 and 9.4% of those age 65 or over.

Arts and culture 

Mount Pleasant is also home to the Midwest Old Thresher's Reunion which attracts a crowd numbering over 100,000 admissions annually during an extended five-day weekend which ends on Labor Day. The reunion dates back to 1950 and pays tribute to the agricultural heritage of the American Midwest in an extensive, highly interactive manner, with live-action exhibition-style displays centering on restored mechanical equipment, particularly steam engines, farm tractors, stationary gas engines, antique and classic cars, the narrow-gauge Midwest Central Railroad, and electric trolleys.

Economy 
Mount Pleasant is home to manufacturing, distribution and agribusiness companies. The more prominent businesses are Wal-Mart Distribution Center, Lomont Molding, Innovaire, Continental ContiTech, Ceco Building Systems and West Liberty Foods.  Iowa Wesleyan University, Henry County Health Center, the Mount Pleasant Correctional Facility and Mount Pleasant Community School District are also larger employers for the city.

Education

Public schools
The public school system in Mount Pleasant is administered by the Mount Pleasant Community School District. The district oversees the high school, middle school and four elementary schools, Harlan, Lincoln, Salem, and Van Allen. The WisdomQuest Education Center serves as an alternative high school for the district.

Higher education
The city is home to Iowa Wesleyan University, which, founded in 1842, ranks as the oldest coeducational college/university west of the Mississippi River. The P.E.O. Sisterhood, an international philanthropic organization for women, was founded on the campus in Mount Pleasant by seven Iowa Wesleyan students.

Transportation
Amtrak, the national passenger rail system, provides service to Mount Pleasant, operating its California Zephyr daily in both directions between Chicago, Illinois, and Emeryville, California, across the bay from San Francisco.

U.S. Route 34 bypasses Mount Pleasant to the north, while U.S. Route 218/Iowa Highway 27 bypass the city to the east.  These highways' former routes through the city are now designated as business routes.

The airport started operations in March 1945.  it has 2 runways: Runway 15/33 is hard surfaced (asphalt) and is 4001 ft long × 75 ft wide (1220 m × 23 m) with runway edge lights; Runway 03/21 is turf and is 1965 ft long × 120 ft wide (599 m × 37 m) marked by yellow cones.

Notable people  

 James Van Allen (1914–2006) – considered one of the country's foremost space scientist.
 Warren Wallace Beckwith (1874–1955) - athlete, husband of Abraham Lincoln's granddaughter.
Belle Coddington (1842-1920), American Civil War nurse, teacher in Mount Pleasant
 Susan Frances Nelson Ferree (1844-1919), journalist, temperance worker, suffragist, and women's rights activist 
 Tom Vilsack – former Mount Pleasant mayor, former governor of Iowa, and current United States Secretary of Agriculture.
 Arabella Mansfield (1846–1911) – first female lawyer in the United States.
 James Harlan (1820–1899) – politician, president of Iowa Wesleyan College.
 Mary Eunice Harlan (1846–1937) – daughter of James Harlan; wife of Robert Todd Lincoln.
 Dana Holgorsen – head coach for the University of Houston football team.
 Leigh S. J. Hunt (1855–1933) – Superintendent of Schools in the 1880s.
 Jessie Wilson Manning (1855-?) - author, lecturer
 Carolyn Pendray (1881–1958) - first woman elected to the Iowa General Assembly.
 Ab Saunders (1851–1883) - Wild West cowboy and outlaw.
 Frederick A. Shannon (1921–1965) – herpetologist.
 Henry Krieger-Coble (born 1992)  – NFL tight end.
 Ricky Phillips (born 1952) - rock bassist, currently with Styx; formerly with The Babys and Bad English
 Harry F. Olson
 Chris Voss FBI Hostage Negotiator, Author of Never Split the Difference

References

External links

 Mount Pleasant Area Chamber Alliance

 
Cities in Iowa
Cities in Henry County, Iowa
1842 establishments in Iowa Territory